The following highways are numbered 812:

Canada
Alberta Highway 812
 Highway 812 (Ontario) (former)

Costa Rica
 National Route 812

United States